Llumina Press is a print-on-demand self-publishing, and distribution company founded by Deborah Greenspan in 2000.

Llumina was founded on the idea that good books require editing before being submitted to print. Therefore, all potential Llumina authors are given a free editing evaluation of their work before a manuscript is accepted for publication.

In 2000, Llumina began editing and publishing books of all types, and has published over 3,000 books since then.

Notable books
In 2005, Llumina Press acquired the rights to Phantom by bestselling author Susan Kay, also author of the worldwide bestseller, Legacy.

Llumina’s book, The Viagra Diaries by Barbara Rose Brooker was acquired by Simon & Schuster and optioned by HBO for a television series.

Bailey, A. Peter (2013). Witnessing Brother Malcolm X: The Master Teacher. Plantation, Fla.: Llumina Press. .

References

External links 
 Llumina Press website

Book publishing companies of the United States